Kvissleby is a locality situated in Sundsvall Municipality, Västernorrland County, Sweden with 2,614 inhabitants in 2010.

Sports
The following sports clubs are located in Kvissleby:

 Svartviks IF

References 

Populated places in Sundsvall Municipality
Medelpad